The White House Conference on Civil Rights was held June 1 and 2, 1966.  The aim of the conference was built on the momentum of the Civil Rights Act of 1964 and the Voting Rights Act of 1965 in addressing discrimination against African-Americans. The four areas of discussion were housing, economic security, education, and the administration of justice.

President Lyndon Johnson had promised this conference in his commencement address at Howard University the year before. Like that address, the conference was named "To Fulfill These Rights." The title was a play on "To Secure These Rights," a report issued by Truman's civil rights commission in 1947. There were over 2,400 participants, representing all the major civil rights groups except SNCC, which boycotted the conference. Out of the conference came a hundred-page report that called for "legislation to ban racial discrimination in housing and the administration of criminal justice, and...suggested increased federal spending to improve the quality of housing and education."

See also
Chicago Open Housing Movement

Notes

1966 conferences
History of civil rights in the United States
White House conferences